Erny Schweitzer (born 13 April 1939) is a Luxembourgian former swimmer. He competed in the men's 200 metre breaststroke at the 1960 Summer Olympics.

References

1939 births
Living people
Luxembourgian male swimmers
Olympic swimmers of Luxembourg
Swimmers at the 1960 Summer Olympics
People from Ettelbruck
Male breaststroke swimmers